The 2005 Women's Oceania Cup was the fourth edition of the women's field hockey tournament. It was held from 30 October to 5 November in Auckland and Sydney.

The tournament served as a qualifier for the 2006 FIH World Cup.

Australia won the tournament for the fourth time, defeating New Zealand in the three–game series, 2–1.

Squads

Head Coach: Frank Murray

Results

Pool

Fixtures

Statistics

Final standings

Goalscorers

References

Women's Oceania Cup
Oceania Cup
Oceania Cup
Oceania Cup
International women's field hockey competitions hosted by Australia
International women's field hockey competitions hosted by New Zealand
Sports competitions in Sydney
2000s in Sydney
Sports competitions in Auckland
2000s in Auckland